The LXXXI Army Corps was an army corps of the German Wehrmacht during World War II. The corps was established in occupied France in 1942 and remained active until 1945.

History 
The LXXXI Army Corps was established in occupied France on 28 May 1942 from the renamed Höheres Kommando z. b. V. XXXII. In turn, the Higher Command XXXII, not to be confused with the XXXII Army Corps, had been established on 15 October 1939 from the Grenzschutz-Abschnittkommando 2. The initial commander of the LXXXI Army Corps was Adolf-Friedrich Kuntzen.

The LXXXI Army Corps, initially headquartered at Rouen, was originally subordinate to the 15th Army under Army Group D between June 1942 and July 1944. It was then moved to the 5th Panzer Army in August 1944, to the 7th Army between September and October 1944, and to the 5th Panzer Army between November and December 1944.

With the beginning of the year 1945, the LXXXI Army Corps was moved back to the 15th Army, where it remained until the end of the war, when it surrendered in the Ruhr Pocket.

Structure

Noteworthy individuals 

 Adolf-Friedrich Kuntzen, corps commander of LXXXI Army Corps (1 April 1942 – 7 September 1944).
 Friedrich-August Schack, corps commander of LXXXI Army Corps (7 September 1944 – 20 September 1944).
 Friedrich Köchling, corps commander of LXXXI Army Corps (20 September 1944 – 10 March 1945).
 Ernst-Günther Baade, corps commander of LXXXI Army Corps (10 March 1945 – May 1945).
 Otto Zeltmann, chief of the general staff of LXXXI Army Corps.

References 

Corps of Germany in World War II
Military units and formations established in 1942
Military units and formations disestablished in 1945